North-Eastern Administrative Okrug ( - Severo-Vostochny administrativny okrug), or Severo-Vostochny Administrative Okrug, is one of the twelve high-level territorial divisions (administrative okrugs) of the federal city of Moscow, Russia. As of the 2010 Census, its population was 1,359,508, up from 1,240,062 recorded during the 2002 Census.

Territorial divisions
The administrative okrug comprises the following seventeen districts:
Alexeyevsky
Altufyevsky
Babushkinsky
Bibirevo
Butyrsky
Lianozovo
Losinoostrovsky
Marfino
Maryina roshcha
Ostankinsky
Otradnoye
Rostokino
Severnoye Medvedkovo
Severny
Sviblovo
Yaroslavsky
Yuzhnoye Medvedkovo

References

Notes

Sources

 
Administrative okrugs of Moscow
